In classical architecture, a metope (μετόπη) is a rectangular architectural element that fills the space between two triglyphs in a Doric frieze, which is a decorative band of alternating triglyphs and metopes above the architrave of a building of the Doric order. Metopes often had painted or sculptural decoration; the most famous example are the 92 metopes of the Parthenon, some of which depict the battle between the Centaurs and the Lapiths.  The painting on most metopes has been lost, but sufficient traces remain to allow a close idea of their original appearance.

In terms of structure, metopes may be carved from a single block with a triglyph (or triglyphs), or they may be cut separately and slide into slots in the triglyph blocks as at the Temple of Aphaea. Sometimes the metopes and friezes were cut from different stone, so as to provide color contrast.  Although they tend to be close to square in shape, some metopes are noticeably larger in height or in width.  They may also vary in width within a single structure to allow for corner contraction, an adjustment of the column spacing and arrangement of the Doric frieze in a temple to make the design appear more harmonious.

Ancient architecture 
The triglyph frieze is part of the Doric order, found in ancient Greece in the 7th century BC and was mainly used in temple architecture. But even later, the Doric order and with it the metopes were used as a structuring and decorative principle of order in Greek architecture. In the early days, the metopes were open and could contain vases or sacrificial skulls. Later, the free spaces were closed with panels made of different materials. These plates could be painted or provided with reliefs.

Gallery

See also
 Classical order

References 

 Robertson, D. S. (1929). Handbook of Greek and Roman Architecture. Cambridge: Cambridge University Press.

External links 
 

Ancient Greek architecture
Ancient Greek sculpture
Ancient Roman architectural elements
Ancient Roman sculpture
Columns and entablature
Architectural sculpture